Andilena Nord (Andilena Avatrea) is a rural town and commune in Madagascar. It belongs to the district of Ambatondrazaka, which is a part of Alaotra-Mangoro Region. The population of the commune is 9,042 by 2018.

There are beryl deposits to be found in this town.

References and notes 

Populated places in Alaotra-Mangoro